This is a list of the complete squads for the 2018 Six Nations Championship, an annual rugby union tournament contested by the national rugby teams of England, France, Ireland, Italy, Scotland and Wales. England were the defending champions.

Note: Number of caps and players' ages are indicated as of 3 February 2018 – the tournament's opening day.

England
On 18 January, Eddie Jones named a 35-man squad ahead of their opening Championship match, against Italy.

Head coach:  Eddie Jones

Call-ups
On 29 January, James Haskell and Joe Marler were called up to the squad, although are unavailable for selection for the earlier rounds due to suspension.

On 5 February, Eddie Jones called up Luke Cowan-Dickie, Nathan Hughes and Richard Wigglesworth, with Wigglesworth replacing Ben Youngs who was injured in round one.

On 12 February, Sam Moore and Gabriel Ibitoye joined the squad during the first break, with Ibitoye joining Marcus Smith as an apprentice player.

On 26 February, Charlie Ewels was brought into the squad as part of the training squad ahead of the French game.

On 3 March, Ewels remained with the squad, whilst Elliot Daly rejoined the squad after recovering for injury.

On 11 March, Don Armand joined the squad as an injury replacement for Nathan Hughes who was ruled out of the final round.

France
On the 17 January, Jacques Brunel named a 32-man squad ahead of France's opening Championship match against Ireland.

Head coach:  Jacques Brunel

Call-ups
On 22 January, Hugo Bonneval and Baptiste Serin were added to the squad as injury cover for Brice Dulin and Morgan Parra who were injured in the final round of the European Champions Cup.

On 24 January, Camille Chat was unable to join the group because of flu like symptoms. He was replaced by Adrien Pélissié.

On 25 January, Anthony Jelonch injured himself in training and was replaced by Alexandre Lapandry.

On 30 January, Christopher Tolofua injured himself, he was not replaced by another player.

On 5 February, Lionel Beauxis, Baptiste Couilloud, and Louis Picamoles where called up to replace Matthieu Jalibert, Antoine Dupont, and Kévin Gourdon respectively, who were injured in the first match against Ireland.

On 13 February, Mathieu Babillot, Camille Chat, François Trinh-Duc, Mathieu Bastareaud, Gaël Fickou, Kélian Galletier, Rémy Grosso, Bernard Le Roux, and Romain Taofifenua where called up to replace Anthony Belleau, Rémi Lamerat, Félix Lambey, Alexandre Lapandry, Sékou Macalou, Arthur Iturria, Louis Picamoles, Jonathan Danty, and Teddy Thomas respectively, who were suspended due to inappropriate behaviour after the second match against Scotland.

On 12 March, Pierre Bougarit was called up because of an injury to Guilhem Guirado which made him uncertain for the match against Wales. Whilst Arthur Iturria was called up to replace the injured Romain Taofifénua.

On 13 March, after an HIA protocol done 48 hours post-match on Hugo Bonneval after the England match, it was confirmed that he must now follow a gradual return to rugby protocol which does not allow him to train with the team until the Friday before the match against Wales, therefore Yoann Huget was called as a backup.

Ireland
On the 17 January, Joe Schmidt announced a 36-man squad for the opening two rounds of the Championship.

Head coach:  Joe Schmidt

Call-ups
On 22 January, James Cronin was added to the squad as injury cover for Dave Kilcoyne who was injured in the final round of the European Champions Cup.

On 19 February, John Cooney, Garry Ringrose and Niall Scannell were called into the squad ahead of the round 3 clash with Wales as injury cover for Luke McGrath, Robbie Henshaw and Rob Herring.

Italy
On the 25 January, Conor O'Shea announced a 31-man squad for the opening two rounds of the Championship.

Head coach:  Conor O'Shea

Call-ups
On 27 February, O'Shea named a 32-man squad for the final two rounds of the Championship; Dario Chistolini, Luca Morisi, Guglielmo Palazzani, Jake Polledri and Federico Zani were new additions to the Championship squad.

Scotland
On the 16 January, Gregor Townsend named a 40-man squad for the Championship.

Head coach:  Gregor Townsend

Call-ups
On 22 January, Neil Cochrane was added to the squad as injury cover for George Turner who was injured in the final round of the European Champions Cup.

On 17 February, Matt Scott and Tim Swinson were called up to the squad as injury replacements for Duncan Taylor and Richie Gray, whilst James Malcolm, WP Nel, Josh Strauss and Tim Visser joined the squad, replacing Murray McCallum, D'Arcy Rae, Magnus Bradbury and Nathan Fowles.

On 5 March, Fraser Brown, Zander Fagerson, John Hardie, George Horne and Darryl Marfo were called up ahead of the Irish test in round 4, with Brown, Fagerson and Marfo rejoining the squad after recovering from respective injuries.

On 12 March, Scott Cummings, Matt Fagerson, Adam Hastings and Richie Vernon joined the squad ahead of the final round game against Italy.

Wales
On the 16 January, Warren Gatland named a 39-man squad for the Championship.

Head coach:  Warren Gatland

Call-ups
On 25 January, Rhys Webb was ruled out of the Championship due to injury, Tomos Williams replaced Webb in the squad.

On 1 February, Scott Baldwin was released from the squad due to injury, ruling him out of the whole Championship. Ryan Elias was added as his replacement.

On 6 March, Rhodri Jones was drafted into the squad as an injury replacement for Wyn Jones.

References

squads
2018 Squads